641 Agnes, provisional designation , is a stony Florian asteroid and slow rotator from the inner regions of the asteroid belt, approximately  in diameter.

It was discovered on 8 September 1907, by German astronomer Max Wolf at Heidelberg Observatory in southern Germany. The meaning of the asteroids's name is unknown.

Classification and orbit
Agnes is a stony S-type asteroid and a member of the Flora family, one of the largest groups of stony asteroids in the asteroid belt. It orbits the Sun in the inner main-belt at a distance of 1.9–2.5 AU once every 3 years and 4 months (1,208 days). Its orbit has an eccentricity of 0.13 and an inclination of 2° with respect to the ecliptic.
The body's observation arc begins with a recovered observation at Vienna Observatory, one month after its official discovery observation at Heidelberg.

Physical characteristics

Rotation period
In March 1975, photometric observations by Swedish astronomer Claes-Ingvar Lagerkvist measured a period of 8.9 hours for Agnes. The lightcurve, however, was fragmentary and the result uncertain.

In October 2013, the first reliable rotational lightcurve of Agnes was obtained by astronomers Frederick Pilcher, Lorenzo Franco and Luis Martinez at Organ Mesa  and Balzaretto Observatory  respectively. Lightcurve analysis gave a well-defined rotation period of 178.0 hours with a brightness variation of 0.55 magnitude. The team also assumed a standard albedo for stony S-type asteroids of 0.20, calculated an absolute magnitude of 12.64,  estimated a mean diameter of  kilometers, and measured a V–R color index of 0.50.

With such a long rotation period, Agnes is a slow rotator, of which a few hundred minor planets are currently known.

Diameter and albedo
The Collaborative Asteroid Lightcurve Link adopts the results obtained by Pilcher, and calculates a diameter of 8.81 kilometers.

Naming
Any reference of this minor planet's name to a person or occurrence is unknown.

Unknown meaning
Among the many thousands of named minor planets, Agnes is one of 120 asteroids, for which no official naming citation has been published.

References

External links
  Occultation of Star HIP 103032 by 641 Agnes
 Asteroid Lightcurve Database (LCDB), query form (info )
 Dictionary of Minor Planet Names, Google books
 Asteroids and comets rotation curves, CdR – Observatoire de Genève, Raoul Behrend
 Discovery Circumstances: Numbered Minor Planets (1)-(5000) – Minor Planet Center
 
 

000641
000641
Discoveries by Max Wolf
Named minor planets
000641
19070908